Cemais Uwch Nyfer was a mediaeval Welsh commote in the Dyfed cantref of Cemais, in what is now Pembrokeshire. It consisted of the territory between the Afon Nyfer and Fishguard, and its civil headquarters were at Newport.

The commote was made part of the Norman March in the 12th century, and had at least eight Norman castles (Newport, Little Newcastle, Puncheston, Castlebythe, Henry's Moat, Maenclochog, Llangolman and Llanfyrnach). It ceased to be significant at the time of the Laws in Wales Acts 1535–1542, its functions being taken over by the Hundred of Cemais. It is in the predominantly Welsh-speaking north of Pembrokeshire.

Parishes
It was composed of the following parishes:

Notes

Commotes
History of Pembrokeshire